Glonium is a genus of fungi belonging to the family Gloniaceae.

The genus was first described by Gotthilf Heinrich Ernst Muhlenberg in 1813.

Species:
 Glonium graphicum
 Glonium lineare

References

Mytilinidiales